Connor Hall (born 23 May 1993) is an English professional footballer who plays as a defender for  club Colchester United.

Hall began his career with Isthmian League side Bury Town, playing for the club from 2011 to 2016, apart from a short spell spent with St Neots Town in 2015. He then spent two seasons in the Southern League with Biggleswade Town, before joining National League North club Brackley Town in 2018. He continued his move up the non-League pyramid by signing with Harrogate Town in May 2019. He helped Harrogate to secure a place in the English Football League with victory in the 2020 National League play-off final. This was followed by victory in the delayed 2020 FA Trophy final. He was sold on to Port Vale in January 2022 and helped the club to win promotion out of League Two via the play-offs in four months later. He was sold on to Colchester United in January 2023 for an undisclosed fee.

Career

Early career
Originally from St Neots, Hall attended West Suffolk College. He started his senior career at Bury Town in the 2011–12 season after being encouraged to join the club by Willingham-based coach Dean Greygoose. He had a trial at Leyton Orient in 2012 and at the age of 21, he was set to sign for Cambridge United after being scouted towards the end of the 2012–13 season, but the deal was cancelled as a result of a groin injury that kept him sidelined for 18 months. He underwent four operations to correct the problem. He missed the entire 2013–14 season, with the club in decline due to financial problems and soon to lose long-standing manager Richard Wilkins, but Hall decided to stay on upon his recovery. He would make 43 appearances in the 2014–15 season, scoring five goals, as the "Blues" finished bottom of the Isthmian League Premier Division.

Hall joined Southern League Premier Division side St Neots Town in the summer of 2015, but he returned to Bury Town on 24 November 2015. He later said that he went to St Neots because they were close to his home but he did not enjoy playing for the "Saints". He featured 22 times for both St Neots and Bury Town during the 2015–16 season, before leaving Bury Town after receiving a higher paid offer from a club closer to his home. Bury Town manager Ben Chenery noted Hall's hard work and later said that "he played centre-half, central midfield and left-back for us and was seamless in every one of those positions".

In the summer of 2016, Hall signed for Southern Football League Premier Division side Biggleswade Town. He played in a more advanced position for the club and scored 18 goals over the course of two seasons.

He signed for National League North side Brackley Town in June 2018. He partnered with Gareth Dean in central defence. Brackley finished the 2018–19 season in third-place, with only champions Stockport County conceding fewer goals. Kevin Wilkin's "Saints" qualified for the play-off semi-finals, but were defeated by Spennymoor Town in a penalty shoot-out following a 0–0 draw at St James Park.

Harrogate Town
On 15 May 2019, Hall signed for National League side Harrogate Town on a two-year contract; he was the club's first signing of the summer and was described as a "big target" by manager Simon Weaver. He played 33 league games before the 2019–20 season was halted and ultimately decided on goal average due to the COVID-19 pandemic in England, with the "Sulphurites" qualifying for the play-offs. He scored Harrogate Town's second goal in the play-off final as the club would go on to be promoted to the Football League for the first time in their history with a 3–1 victory over Notts County. In response to Harrogate's victory, Hall said "It's a dream come true to play at Wembley, win at Wembley, score at Wembley". He was named as the club's Player's Player of the Season. He was the subject of interest from a League One club in the summer, who failed to agree a fee with Harrogate.

He made his Football League debut on 5 September 2020 in a 1–1 draw against Tranmere Rovers in the EFL Cup, in which Harrogate won 8–7 in the resulting penalty shoot-out. He scored his first goal in the Football League on 1 December, in a 5–2 defeat to Scunthorpe United at Wetherby Road. He signed a new three-and-a-half-year contract with Harrogate in January. He ended the 2020–21 campaign with 44 appearances to his name as Town finished in 17th-place. On 3 May 2021, he won the FA Trophy with Harrogate in the long delayed 2020 final behind closed doors at Wembley against Concord Rangers; Harrogate won the match 1–0. He remained a key first-team player in the first half of the 2021–22 season, playing 25 games.

Port Vale
On 11 January 2022, Hall joined fellow League Two side Port Vale in a permanent move. He joined the club for an undisclosed fee, signing a contract of undisclosed length, on the same day that veteran centre-back Leon Legge moved to Harrogate from Port Vale. His second goal for the club, a header at Hartlepool United, secured a 1–0 victory and important three points in the "Valiants" automatic promotion push; speaking after the match, Hall praised interim manager Andy Crosby and also stated that "all the staff, and the players as well, the whole club are all as one". He started in the play-off final at Wembley Stadium as Vale secured promotion with a 3–0 victory over Mansfield Town; Michael Baggaley of The Sentinel wrote that his "clearance off the line denied Mansfield a way back into the game" and that he put in a "calm defensive display".

He scored on the opening day of the 2022–23 campaign, his League One debut, as Vale came from behind to beat Fleetwood Town 2–1. He was dropped from the starting eleven following a loss of form in September, with Dan Jones playing in his stead, but regained his place the following month. However he found the commute from his home in Cambridgeshire difficult, leaving director of football David Flitcroft and manager Darrell Clarke to agree to let him depart for a club closer to Cambridgeshire.

Colchester United
On 7 January 2023, Hall signed a two-and-a-half year deal with League Two side Colchester United after being signed for an undisclosed fee.

Style of play
Hall is a strong, commanding centre-back who is also comfortable on the ball and can play in midfield if needed.

Career statistics

Honours
Harrogate Town
National League play-offs: 2020
FA Trophy: 2019–20

Port Vale
EFL League Two play-offs: 2022

References

1993 births
Living people
English footballers
People from St Neots
Association football fullbacks
Bury Town F.C. players
St Neots Town F.C. players
Biggleswade Town F.C. players
Brackley Town F.C. players
Harrogate Town A.F.C. players
Port Vale F.C. players
Colchester United F.C. players
Isthmian League players
Southern Football League players
National League (English football) players
English Football League players